Derovatellus is a genus of beetles in the family Dytiscidae, containing the following species:

 Derovatellus africanus Régimbart, 1889
 Derovatellus alluaudi Guignot, 1936
 Derovatellus assinicus Régimbart, 1889
 Derovatellus ater Bilardo & Pederzani, 1978
 Derovatellus baloghi Biström, 1979
 Derovatellus bisignatus Ahlwarth, 1921
 Derovatellus bistroemi Brancucci, 1981
 Derovatellus bruchi Zimmermann, 1919
 Derovatellus caprai Guignot, 1952
 Derovatellus corvus Guignot, 1954
 Derovatellus dagombae Biström, 1979
 Derovatellus decellei Biström, 1979
 Derovatellus dimorphus Guignot, 1936
 Derovatellus duplex Guignot, 1956
 Derovatellus erratus Biström, 1979
 Derovatellus eupteryx Guignot, 1955
 Derovatellus fasciatus Régimbart, 1895
 Derovatellus ferrugineus Bilardo & Pederzani, 1978
 Derovatellus floridanus Fall, 1932
 Derovatellus hancocki Biström, 1981
 Derovatellus intermedius Biström, 1986
 Derovatellus kamerunensis Biström, 1979
 Derovatellus lentus (Wehncke, 1876)
 Derovatellus lugubris Guignot, 1955
 Derovatellus macrocolus Guignot, 1956
 Derovatellus marmottani Guignot, 1940
 Derovatellus mocquerysi Régimbart, 1895
 Derovatellus natalensis Omer-Cooper, 1965
 Derovatellus nyanzae Biström, 1980
 Derovatellus obscurus Régimbart, 1895
 Derovatellus olofi Franciscolo & Sanfilippo, 1991
 Derovatellus onorei Biström, 1982
 Derovatellus orientalis Wehncke, 1883
 Derovatellus peruanus Spangler, 1967
 Derovatellus regimbarti Guignot, 1936
 Derovatellus roosevelti K.B.Miller, 2005
 Derovatellus rostrata (Koch & Berendt, 1854)
 Derovatellus ruficollis Régimbart, 1895
 Derovatellus satoi Biström, 2003
 Derovatellus spangleri K.B.Miller, 2005
 Derovatellus taeniatus Biström, 1979
 Derovatellus wewalkai Biström, 1979
 Derovatellus wittei Biström, 1979

References

Dytiscidae